Neo Monastiri is a village of the Municipality of Domokos. Its residents are mostly refugees from Eastern Rumelia. Its name was Tsioba until 1927. According to 2011's census there are 1,159 residents in Neo Monastiri.

Civilization

Traditions and events 
 
Many events are made to  preserve cultural tradition. The main event is at  the New Year, where   inhabitants c  engage in a traditional North Thracian dance.

References 

Villages in Greece
Populated places in Phthiotis